Middle Japanese may refer to:

 Early Middle Japanese, a Japanese linguistic period spanning c. 800–1200
 Late Middle Japanese, a Japanese linguistic period spanning c. 1200–1600